The Defense Academic Information Technology Consortium (or DAITC), formerly the Department of Defense Education Information Security Working Group (DODEISWG), is an organization consisting of IT leadership from a number of United States Federal Government academic degree-granting institutions.  The group advocates the use of information technology resources to advance the educational mission of the U.S. Department of Defense and other federal agencies.

DAITC was organized and founded by the Naval War College in May 2008 and disbanded at the direction of Naval War College leadership in October 2009.

Talk of its demise, however, was somewhat premature.  Chairmanship was moved to the National Defense University in 2009. The group narrowed its focus and membership so that it could address problems among accredited academic institutions more effectively. Meetings have been held every six months at different sites. Currently, the DAITC meets in conjunction with the Military Education Coordination Council's (MECC)  Distance Learning Coordination Council (DLCC) and the MECC's Library working group.

United States Federal Academic Degree Granting Institutions

 Department of the Air Force
 Air Force Institute of Technology
 Air University
 U.S. Air Force Academy
 Department of the Army
 U.S. Army Command & General Staff College
 U.S. Army War College
 U.S. Military Academy
 Department of the Navy
 Marine Corps University
 Naval Postgraduate School
 Naval War College
 U.S. Naval Academy
 Other DoD
 Defense Academy for Credibility Assessment
 Defense Language Institute Foreign Language Center
 National Defense Intelligence College
 National Defense University
 Uniformed Services University of the Health Sciences
 Non-DOD
 U.S. Coast Guard Academy
 U.S. Merchant Marine Academy

Conferences
 Naval War College, Newport, Rhode Island - 25 September 2008
 Uniformed Services University of the Health Sciences, Bethesda, Maryland - 18–19 June 2009
 Denver, Colorado (in conjunction with EDUCAUSE 2009 - November 2009
 Air University, Maxwell AFB, Montgomery, Alabama - March 2010
 Naval War College, Newport, Rhode Island - September 2010
 Joint Forces Staff College, Norfolk, Virginia - March 2011

United States Department of Defense information technology
Military education and training in the United States
2008 establishments in the United States